Andrew James Bellatti (born August 5, 1991) is an American professional baseball pitcher for the Philadelphia Phillies of Major League Baseball (MLB). He has previously played in MLB for the Tampa Bay Rays and Miami Marlins. Bellatti was drafted by the Rays in the 12th round of the 2009 MLB draft, and made his MLB debut in 2015.

Career

Tampa Bay Rays
Bellatti was drafted by the Tampa Bay Rays in the 12th round, 379th overall, of the 2009 Major League Baseball Draft out of Steele Canyon High School in Spring Valley, California. He made his professional debut with the GCL Rays, and played for the rookie ball Princeton Rays in 2010. In November 2010 he was sentenced to jail for a fatal car crash that he was involved with in January 2010. He had collided head on with an oncoming driver after illegally crossing a double-yellow line and speeding, killing the other driver and injuring the driver's passenger and the passenger in the car with Bellatti. He had been sentenced to eight months, but was released after less than 90 days due to a plea agreement and time served. After he was released from jail he returned to the pitching in the Rays organization.

In 2011, Bellatti played for the Low-A Hudson Valley Renegades, pitching to a 3–5 record and 2.63 ERA in 15 games. In 2012, he played for the Single-A Bowling Green Hot Rods, recording a 7–3 record and 2.97 ERA with 99 strikeouts 91.0 innings of work. The next year, he split the year between the Single-A Charlotte Stone Crabs and the Double-A Montgomery Biscuits, posting a 7–4 record and 4.30 ERA between the two clubs. In 2014, he spent the season in Montgomery, registering a 2–6 record and 3.68 ERA in 46 appearances. He was assigned to the Triple-A Durham Bulls to begin the 2015 season.

Bellatti was called up to the majors for the first time on May 9, 2015. He made his MLB debut the same day, earning the win after pitching 3.1 scoreless innings against the Texas Rangers. He finished his rookie season with a 2.31 ERA in 17 appearances. Bellatti began the 2016 season with Durham, but the Rays designated him for assignment on June 24, 2016. He spent the remainder of the year in the Rays minor league system and elected free agency on November 7, 2016.

Baltimore Orioles
On March 14, 2017, Bellatti signed a minor league deal with the Baltimore Orioles. He was assigned to the High-A Aberdeen IronBirds but did not play in a game due to injury. He elected free agency on November 6, 2017.

Sugar Land Skeeters
On April 15, 2019, Bellatti signed with the Sugar Land Skeeters of the Atlantic League of Professional Baseball. He pitched a scoreless inning for the club in his only appearance.

New York Yankees
On April 29, 2019, Bellatti's contract was purchased by the New York Yankees. Bellatti split time between the High-A Tampa Tarpons and the Double-A Trenton Thunder, accumulating a 3–0 record and 5.50 ERA in 25 appearances between the two teams. He was released by the Yankees on August 23, 2019.

Sugar Land Skeeters (second stint)
On February 26, 2020, Bellatti signed with the Sugar Land Skeeters of the Atlantic League of Professional Baseball. However, Bellatti did not play in a game for the team due to the cancellation of the ALPB season because of the COVID-19 pandemic. He became a free agent after the year.

Miami Marlins
On March 2, 2021, Bellati signed with the Tri-City ValleyCats of the Frontier League. However, on May 28, Bellatti signed a minor league contract with the Miami Marlins organization. He was assigned to the Double-A Pensacola Blue Wahoos and later received a promotion to the Triple-A Jacksonville Jumbo Shrimp, posting a 2.03 ERA in 12 appearances between the two teams. On July 19, Bellatti was selected to the active roster. That day, he made his first MLB appearance since 2015, but allowed 5 earned runs in an inning and a third against the Washington Nationals. Bellatti was designated for assignment by Miami on July 23 after struggling to a 19.29 ERA in 2 appearances. Bellatti was sent outright to Triple-A Jacksonville on July 26. Bellatti was selected to the 40-man roster on October 1. Bellatti elected free agency on October 21.

Philadelphia Phillies
On November 19, 2021, Bellatti signed a minor league contract with the Philadelphia Phillies. On April 14, 2022, he had his contract purchased from the Triple-A Lehigh Valley IronPigs.

In the 2022 regular season with the Phillies, he was 4–4 with two saves and a 3.31 ERA in 59 games (one start) over 54.1 innings with 78 strikeouts.

References

External links

1991 births
Living people
People from Spring Valley, San Diego County, California
Baseball players from San Diego
Major League Baseball pitchers
Tampa Bay Rays players
Miami Marlins players
Philadelphia Phillies players
Gulf Coast Rays players
Princeton Rays players
Hudson Valley Renegades players
Bowling Green Hot Rods players
Charlotte Stone Crabs players
Montgomery Biscuits players
Durham Bulls players
Sugar Land Skeeters players
Pensacola Blue Wahoos players
Jacksonville Jumbo Shrimp players